2 Chronicles 19 is the nineteenth chapter of the Second Book of Chronicles the Old Testament in the Christian Bible or of the second part of the Books of Chronicles in the Hebrew Bible. The book is compiled from older sources by an unknown person or group, designated by modern scholars as "the Chronicler", and had the final shape established in late fifth or fourth century BCE. This chapter belongs to the section focusing on the kingdom of Judah until its destruction by the Babylonians under Nebuchadnezzar and the beginning of restoration under Cyrus the Great of Persia  (2 Chronicles 10 to 36). The focus of this chapter (as all chapters from 17 to 20) is the reign of Jehoshaphat, king of Judah.

Text
This chapter was originally written in the Hebrew language and is divided into 11 verses.

Textual witnesses
Some early manuscripts containing the text of this chapter in Hebrew are of the Masoretic Text tradition, which includes the Aleppo Codex (10th century), and Codex Leningradensis (1008).

There is also a translation into Koine Greek known as the Septuagint, made in the last few centuries BCE. Extant ancient manuscripts of the Septuagint version include Codex Vaticanus (B; B; 4th century), and Codex Alexandrinus (A; A; 5th century).

Old Testament references

: ; ; ; 
: ;

Jehoshaphat reproved by Jehu (19:1–3)
Jehoshaphat's safe home return (in contrast to Ahab's death) literally fulfilled Micaiah's demands (18:16), although 'not complying with the spirit of his plea'. The prophet Jehu, the son of Hanani (cf. 2 Chronicles 16:7–9) rebuked Jehoshaphat for making an alliance with Ahab of Israel (cf. 2 Chronicles 16:1–6), because with the act, Jehoshaphat was not faithful to God in that 'he proposed to help the wicked and was loyal to those who hate the Lord'.  'Love' and 'hate' here are not 'emotional terms', but parts of a 'political vocabulary'; 'to love' means virtually 'to form a coalition'. The attacke by the Transjordanian alliance in chapter 20 could be interpreted as the realization of God's anger at Jehoshaphat.

Jehoshaphat's reforms (19:4–11)
Jehoshaphat continued to develop the policies he established at the start of his reign (2 Chronicles 17), extending to the territory of northern kingdom he controlled (verse 4; cf. ). The judicial reform may reflect the element "shaphat" ("to judge") in Jehoshaphat's name (cf. 2 Chronicles 16:12).

Verse 11
And, behold, Amariah the chief priest is over you in all matters of the Lord; and Zebadiah the son of Ishmael, the ruler of the house of Judah, for all the king's matters: also the Levites shall be officers before you. Deal courageously, and the Lord shall be with the good.
" Amariah the chief priest": or "High Priest" (ha-rosh, "the Head"; cf. 2 Chronicles 24:6).  (KJV; or 1 Chronicles 5:37 in Hebrew Bible) lists Amariah as the fifth generation from Zadok, the High Priest during David and Solomon's time, whereas Jehoshaphat was the fifth king from David, so the name Amariah should denote the same person in both verses.
The distinction between "matters of the Lord" and "matters of the king" is found only in the books of Chronicles (1 Chronicles 26:30, 32; 2 Chronicles 19:11) and book of Ezra (Ezra 7:26).

See also

Related Bible parts: 2 Samuel 8, 1 Kings 3, 1 Kings 22, 2 Chronicles 16, 2 Chronicles 17

Notes

References

Sources

 
 Thiele, Edwin R., The Mysterious Numbers of the Hebrew Kings, (1st ed.; New York: Macmillan, 1951; 2d ed.; Grand Rapids: Eerdmans, 1965; 3rd ed.; Grand Rapids: Zondervan/Kregel, 1983).

External links
 Jewish translations:
 Divrei Hayamim II - II Chronicles - Chapter 19 (Judaica Press) in Hebrew and English translation [with Rashi's commentary] at Chabad.org
 Christian translations:
 Online Bible at GospelHall.org (ESV, KJV, Darby, American Standard Version, Bible in Basic English)
 2 Chronicles Chapter 19. Bible Gateway

19